Damien Chapman (born 6 March 1974) is an Australian former rugby league footballer who played in the 1990s.

Originally a schoolboy from St. Gregory's Campbelltown, Damien Chapman played for the St. George Dragons and the Western Reds in the ARL premiership and the London Broncos in the Super League. Damien Chapman is the son of former St. George Dragons first grade winger, John Chapman.

References

Living people
London Broncos players
Western Reds players
St. George Dragons players
Rugby league halfbacks
Australian rugby league players
1974 births
Rugby league players from Sydney